De Knipe is a village in the municipality Heerenveen in the province of Friesland, the Netherlands. It had a population of around 1,455 in January 2017.

History 
The village was first mentioned in 1622 as Nieubrongerga1. De Knipe means artificial narrowing of a stream, and refers to the sluice in the Schoterlandse Compagnonsvaart. There used to be two settlements: Boven-Knijpe which was also known as Nieuw Katlijk and Beneden Knijpe also Nieuw . In 1970, both settlements were joint as De Knipe. The Protestant Church dates from 1661 and is plastered white, and therefore informally called White Church. The Mennonite church dates from 1751. In 1840, Boven-Knijpe was home to 571 people and Beneden-Knijpe had a population of 643 people.

Gallery

References

External links

Populated places in Friesland
Heerenveen